Weitling may refer to:

Günter Weitling (born 1935), a Lutheran theologian and author.
Wilhelm Weitling (1808–1871), German-born radical political theorist

See also 
Weidling (disambiguation)
Weidlinger (disambiguation)

